Walpole Street is a street in Chelsea, London, running north-west to south-east from King's Road to St Leonard's Terrace and Burton's Court.

The MacDonald sisters lived at no 33 in the 1850s.

In 1936, the Scottish architect G. Kay Green (1877–1939) was living at no.1. The actress Susannah York was born at no 18 in 1939.

References

Streets in the Royal Borough of Kensington and Chelsea
Chelsea, London